Isabella Santo Domingo (or Myriam Isabel Santodomingo, born March 28, 1968 in Barranquilla) is a Colombian actress, writer and daughter of Luis Alberto Santo Domingo Molina and Miryam Martínez and mother of Daniella Ossa.

Career
She has worked as an actress, presenter, journalist, playwright, writer, she also won/was nominated for the following awards: Simón Bolívar , Premios TVyNovelas, India Catalina y Midia de España in the category of Best Actress. She also the director of the journals: Shock and Carrusel. She also created and founded Shock Music Awards (Premios Shock de la Musica). She's author of three best-sellers: Los Caballeros Las Prefieren Brutas, A.M. y F.M and Sexorcismo.

Currently, Isabella is writing her fourth book and she is also in the jury of a reality show called Protagonistas de Nuestra Tele by RCN TV, and is also involved in the production of the second season of the series Los Caballeros Las Prefieren Brutas, which is being produced and filmed in Colombia by Sony Entertainment Television.

Recently, she had an idea and decided to spread the initiative D.A.R (Donar, Ayudar, Recaudar) por Colombia around the social network Twitter in order to help people whose lives have been affected by the rain season in Colombia. After only one week, Isabella had gained the attention of artists like Sofia Vergara, Juanes, Shakira and of sportsmen like Edgar Renteria and Juan Pablo Angel, who donated some of their personal values in order to help Isabella raise around US$350,000 needed to help the people in need.

Filmography

References
Gabriel Blanco Representaciones Artisticas
Entrevista de Cromos a Isabella Santo Domingo

External links

1968 births
Living people
Colombian television actresses
Colombian film actresses
People from Barranquilla
20th-century Colombian actresses
21st-century Colombian actresses